North Lindsey College is a further education college in Scunthorpe, North Lincolnshire, England, situated on the A18.

Structure
North Lindsey College is an associate college of the University of Lincoln providing a range of further education and higher education courses. It has two local centres in Ashby and Barton.

College funding decisions are made by the Yorkshire and the Humber Learning and Skills Council in Bradford.

History
The college was established in 1953 as North Lindsey Technical College. Its main building opened in 1964. In 1971 the college became the North Lindsey College of Technology – at that time it was run by Lindsey Education Committee (based in Lincoln). Humberside Education Committee in Beverley took over the administration of the college in 1974.

At that stage it had five departments:
 Business and Management Studies
 Construction
 Engineering
 General Studies
 Science and Metallurgy
 Mathematics and Computing

A college library was built in 1978, and a refectory in 1980. An art and design department opened in 1987. In 1989 it became North Lindsey College. The college logo was designed by local graphic designer and tutor in the art and design department Carole Van Hoffelen and featured a framed 'S' made from 5 parallel lines, symbolic of the local steelworks.

In 2003 the college began producing a newsletter called Clippings, which publishes around 2-3 times year.

In May 2010, an atrium was constructed at the front of the main entrance of the main building, and was opened in September 2010.

During August 2010, the oldest building on the college campus was demolished.

In September 2016, student lanyards were introduced to improve safety to all persons on campus.

Courses
Courses range from basic GCSE to Higher National Diploma to Animal Management, and include National Vocational Qualification courses on the Train to Gain scheme. They also offer BA (Hons) degrees.

References

External links
 North Lindsey College official website
 EduBase
 2008 Ofsted Report (PDF)

University of Lincoln
Further education colleges in Lincolnshire
Education in Scunthorpe
Educational institutions established in 1953
1953 establishments in England